Hankasalmi Observatory is a remote-controlled astronomical observatory in Hankasalmi, Finland. It is owned and operated by astronomy club Jyväskylän Sirius ry. The observaory has a robotic 40 cm Ritchey-Chrétien telescope, an all-sky camera and a 3-meter radio telescope. The optical telescope is used mainly for pro-am research of variable stars and comets.

See also
 List of astronomical observatories

References

Astronomical observatories in Finland